Quetzals are strikingly colored birds in the trogon family. They are found in forests, especially in humid highlands, with the five species from the genus Pharomachrus being exclusively Neotropical, while a single species, the eared quetzal, Euptilotis neoxenus, is found in Guatemala, sometimes in Mexico and very locally in the southernmost United States. In the highlands of the states of Sonora, Chihuahua, Sinaloa, Durango, Nayarit, Zacatecas, Jalisco, and Michoacán, the Eared Quetzal (Euptilotis Neoxenus) can be found from northwest to west-central Mexico. It is a Mesoamerican  indigenous species, but some reports show that it occasionally travels and nests in southeastern Arizona and New Mexico in the United States. June to October is the mating season for Eared Quetzals. Quetzals are fairly large (all over 32 cm or 13 inches long), slightly bigger than other trogon species. The resplendent quetzal is the national bird of Guatemala because of its vibrant colour.

Quetzals have iridescent green or golden-green wing coverts, back, chest and head, with a red belly. Their wings are suited to camouflage under rainy conditions, because their feathers blend well with wet and shiny green area. They are strongly sexually dimorphic, and parts of the females' plumage are brown or grey. The tails of the male quetzals may take up to three years after reaching maturity to grow to the maximum length.These largely solitary birds feed on fruits, berries, insects and small vertebrates (such as frogs). Even with their famous bright plumage, they can be hard to see in their natural wooded habitats.

Conservation status
None of the many quetzal species are under immediate threat in the wild, although the eared and resplendent quetzal are at the Near Threatened status. Pharomachrus mocinno is dependent on standing dead and mature trees for breeding holes, which are only formed in primary cloud forest; the species' breeding behavior is linked to the long term existence of these forests such as the few remaining in highland Guatemala. The remaining are not considered threatened by the IUCN and all are locally common. Among the most concentrated populations are the Baja Verapaz part of the Sierra de las Minas and the Chicabnab Reserve of Alta Verapaz. However, it should be kept in mind while despite the fact that quetzals typically inhabit cloud forests, the fact that they are being divided into much smaller patches is what is known as a principal threat to their survival. Resplendent Quetzals are known to relocate in lower elevated areas during the summertime when precipitation is known to increase, their patterns in movement are most likely correlated to an surplus of ripe Lauraceae fruits.

Etymology
The name quetzal is from Nahuatl  , "large brilliant tail feather" (American Audubon Dictionary) or "tail coverts of the quetzal" (Merriam-Webster's Collegiate Dictionary), from the Nahuatl root  = "stand up" used to refer to an upstanding plume of feathers. The word entered English through Spanish.

The word quetzal was originally used for just the resplendent quetzal, the long-tailed quetzal of Guatemala, (more specifically the area of Northern Guatemala known as the Petén) which is the national bird and the name of the currency of Guatemala. It still often refers to that bird specifically but now also names all the species of the genera Pharomachrus and Euptilotis.

Species
Genus Pharomachrus:
 Crested quetzal, Pharomachrus antisianus.
 Golden-headed quetzal, Pharomachrus auriceps.
 White-tipped quetzal, Pharomachrus fulgidus.
 Resplendent quetzal, Pharomachrus mocinno.
 Pavonine quetzal, Pharomachrus pavoninus.
Genus Euptilotis:
 Eared quetzal, Euptilotis neoxenus.
 Euptilotis neoxenus is related to Pharomachrus and is called the eared quetzal by some authorities, such as the American Ornithologists' Union, but the eared trogon by others.

See also
 List of English words of Nahuatl origin
 The Nest (aviary)

References

External links

 
 Trogon videos, including quetzals, on the Internet Bird Collection
 A study about quetzal, The quetzal description and habitat

Trogonidae
Bird common names